William Steelman Mathis (December 1, 1898 – September 19, 1981) was an American politician who served in the New Jersey Senate from 1941 to 1942 and 1947 to 1966.

A resident of Toms River, New Jersey, Mathis was born in Tuckerton and was a graduate of Toms River High School (since renamed as Toms River High School South) and Peddie School.

References

1898 births
1981 deaths
Republican Party New Jersey state senators
Majority leaders of the New Jersey Senate
Presidents of the New Jersey Senate
Peddie School alumni
People from Toms River, New Jersey
People from Tuckerton, New Jersey
Toms River High School South alumni
20th-century American politicians